Aurōra is the Latin word for dawn, and the goddess of dawn in Roman mythology and Latin poetry.
Like Greek Eos and Rigvedic Ushas, Aurōra continues the name of an earlier Indo-European dawn goddess, Hausos.

Name 
Aurōra stems from Proto-Italic *ausōs, and ultimately from Proto-Indo-European *haéusōs, the "dawn" conceived as divine entity. It has cognates in the goddesses Ēṓs, Uṣas, Aušrinė, Auseklis and Ēastre.

Roman mythology
In Roman mythology, Aurōra renews herself every morning and flies across the sky, announcing the arrival of the Sun. Her parentage was flexible: for Ovid, she could equally be Pallantis, signifying the daughter of Pallas, or the daughter of Hyperion. She has two siblings, a brother (Sol, the Sun) and a sister (Luna, the Moon). Roman writers rarely imitated Hesiod and later Greek poets by naming Aurōra as the mother of the Anemoi (the Winds), who were the offspring of Astraeus, the father of the stars.

Aurōra appears most often in sexual poetry with one of her mortal lovers. A myth taken from the Greek by Roman poets tells that one of her lovers was the prince of Troy, Tithonus. Tithonus was a mortal, and would therefore age and die. Wanting to be with her lover for all eternity, Aurōra asked Jupiter to grant immortality to Tithonus. Jupiter granted her wish, but she failed to ask for eternal youth to accompany his immortality, and he continued to age, eventually becoming forever old.  Aurōra turned him into a cicada.

Mention in literature and music

From Homer's Iliad:

Ovid's Heroides (16.201-202), Paris names his well-known family members, among which Aurōra's lover as follows:

Virgil mentions in the eighth book of his Aeneid:

Rutilius Claudius Namatianus mentions in his 5th century poem De reditu suo:

Shakespeare's Romeo and Juliet (I.i), Montague says of his lovesick son Romeo:

In traditional Irish folk songs, such as "Lord Courtown":

In the poem "Let me not mar that perfect Dream" by Emily Dickinson:

In "On Imagination" by Phillis Wheatley:

In the poem "Tithonus" by Alfred, Lord Tennyson, Aurōra is described thus:

In singer-songwriter Björk's Vespertine track, Aurōra is described as

In Chapter 8 of Charlotte Brontë's Villette, Madame Beck fires her old Governess first thing in the morning and is described by the narrator, Lucy Snowe: All this, I say, was done between the moment of Madame Beck's issuing like Aurōra from her chamber, and that in which she coolly sat down to pour out her first cup of coffee.

The 20th-century Polish poet Zbigniew Herbert wrote about Aurōra's grandchildren. In his poem they are ugly, even though they will grow to be beautiful ("Kwestia Smaku").

The first and strongest of the 50 Spacer worlds in The Caves of Steel and subsequent novels by Isaac Asimov is named after the goddess Aurora. Its capital city is Eos.

Depiction in art

 Aurōra, fresco by Guido Reni (1614) in Palazzo Pallavicini-Rospigliosi, Rome
 Aurōra by Guercino (1591–1666)
 The Countess de Brac as Aurōra by Jean-Marc Nattier (1685–1766)
 Aurōra e Titone by Francesco de Mura (1696–1782)
 Aurōra and Cephalus, by Anne-Louis Girodet de Roussy-Trioson  (1767–1824)
 The Gates of Dawn by Herbert James Draper (1863–1920)
 Aurōra and Cephalus by Pierre-Narcisse Guérin (1774–1833)
 Aurōra by Odilon Redon (1840 – 1916).
 Aurore by Denys Puech (1854 – 1942).

See also
Dawn goddess
Eos
List of solar deities
Mater Matuta
Memnon (mythology)
Zorya

References

External links

 Warburg Institute Iconographic Database  (ca 110 images of Aurōra)
 
 

 
Roman goddesses
Solar goddesses
H₂éwsōs
Dawn goddesses
Light goddesses
Personifications in Roman mythology
Eos